The Festive Fifty was originally an annual list of the year's 50 (though the exact figure varied above and below this number) best songs compiled at the end of the year and voted for by listeners to John Peel's BBC Radio 1 show.  It was usually dominated by indie and rock songs which did not fully represent the diversity of music played by Peel but rather the majority opinion among his listeners.  After Peel's death the tradition of the Festive Fifty was continued, first by other Radio 1 DJs and then (when Radio 1 decided to discontinue it) by the Internet radio station Dandelion Radio.

History
The first Festive Fifty was broadcast in 1976 and differed in format to later charts in that it was not restricted to songs from that year. It was topped by Led Zeppelin's "Stairway to Heaven", first released in 1971, and also contained many older songs. The following year, Peel's producer suggested that instead of taking a poll (which might simply be a retread of 1976's list), Peel should simply compile a list of his favourite songs of the year. Long thought lost, this list of the "Forgotten Fifty" (consisting of 61 songs) was finally pieced together from rare archive materials for the 2007 BBC book The Peel Sessions. The following years returned to a listener poll and listed mostly contemporary songs - "Anarchy in the UK" by the Sex Pistols topped three consecutive charts from 1978 and came second in the 1981. This marked a period of domination of the upper reaches of the chart by punk artists as the genre was embraced by Peel and his listeners, though other genres were represented further down the list, and the continuing presence in the list of "Stairway to Heaven" until 1979 showed that the older generation of Peel listeners had not completely abandoned the show. 

In 1982 the shift to a strictly annual chart was made. In the early 1980s post-punk records by bands such as Joy Division and The Cocteau Twins featured heavily in the chart. In the mid and later 1980s indie bands began to gain recognition with The Smiths making many appearances, including a record eleven entries in the 1987 list, but by this time Peel was beginning to become disillusioned with his listeners' tastes, complaining that there were too many "white boys with guitars" and not enough diversity. This trend of popular music continued in the early 1990s, despite Peel's championing of emerging rave and dance acts on his show. In 1991 Peel didn't get around to compiling the Fifty until the following year, and didn't broadcast it until 1993, where he played one song from it once a week. This 1991 chart, which became known as the "Phantom Fifty", was not the only year to feature an anomaly. In 1997 Peel decided that he didn't have enough time on-air around Christmas to do a countdown, and it was only from listener pressure that he agreed to do a 'Pretty Festive 31', which was topped by Cornershop's Brimful of Asha. Despite this, the later 1990s and 2000s the list featured a more diverse range of acts, such as The Delgados and The Cuban Boys, who were favourites of Peel and his listeners. 

After John Peel died in 2004, the chart for that year was played by Rob Da Bank and was topped by The Fall - Peel's favourite band and prolific session guests. Huw Stephens from Radio 1's One Music strand, the original replacement for Peel's show, joined fellow One Music presenter Rob Da Bank for the chart for 2005.

In 2006, after One Music was removed from the Radio 1 schedule, the Festive Fifty was discontinued. Peel's former production team, however, invited the internet radio station Dandelion Radio to take up the compilation and broadcast of the Festive Fifty, which they have done since 2006.

All-time charts
The Festive Fifty began as an all-time chart. (1976, 78, 79, 80 and 81 were all-time charts.) Two all-time charts have been compiled in addition to yearly charts, once in 1982 and again in 2000 (to celebrate the millennium). The 1982 chart focused heavily on punk and post-punk artists.  It was topped by the Sex Pistols, with Joy Division, The Clash, New Order and Siouxsie and the Banshees all making numerous appearances. The 2000 chart was a more diverse affair. It still contained many of the same songs - three of the top five were the same - but newer bands (such as Pavement and Stereolab) had been assimilated and also older artists from a wider variety of genres made appearances (such as Nick Drake and The Beach Boys.)

Festive 50 number ones

Note 1: All-time list

References

External links
The Festive 50s, 1976-2004
The Festive 50, 2005
The Festive 50s - Dandelion Radio (2006–present)

Lists of rated songs
John Peel